Icaricia saepiolus, the greenish blue, is a butterfly of the family Lycaenidae. It is found from the northwestern United States to southern Saskatchewan and Alberta.

The wingspan is 21–28 mm. Adults are on wing from June to August.

The larvae feed on Trifolium monathum, Trifolium longipes, and Trifolium wormskioldii.

Subspecies
I. s. hilda (J. & R. Grinnel, 1907)
I. s. insulanus (Blackmore, 1919)
I. s. amica Edwards, 1863
I. s. gertschi (dos Passos, 1938)
I. s. whitmeri (Brown, 1951)
I. s. aureolus Emmel & Mattoon, 1998

References

External links
Greenish Blue, Butterflies and Moths of North America

Icaricia
Butterflies of North America
Butterflies described in 1852
Taxa named by Jean Baptiste Boisduval